Alvin Raymond Collins (August 4, 1927 – November 3, 1991) was an American football defensive tackle who played for the National Football League's San Francisco 49ers and New York Giants as well as in Canada for the Saskatchewan Roughriders in 1953 and the Hamilton Tiger-Cats in 1955 (winning All-Canadian honors), and finally for the American Football League's Dallas Texans. He played college football at Louisiana State University for the LSU Tigers football team.

See also
List of American Football League players

References

1927 births
1991 deaths
American football defensive linemen
LSU Tigers football players
San Francisco 49ers players
New York Giants players
Dallas Texans (AFL) players
Saskatchewan Roughriders players
Hamilton Tiger-Cats players
Western Conference Pro Bowl players
Sportspeople from Harris County, Texas
Players of American football from Shreveport, Louisiana
People from Tomball, Texas